is a former Japanese football player.

Club statistics

References

External links

1987 births
Living people
Shizuoka Sangyo University alumni
Association football people from Shizuoka Prefecture
Japanese footballers
J2 League players
Singapore Premier League players
Roasso Kumamoto players
Albirex Niigata Singapore FC players
Home United FC players
Geylang International FC players
Expatriate footballers in Singapore
Association football forwards